The 1998 Marshall Thundering Herd football team represented Marshall University in the 1998 NCAA Division I-A football season.  It was Marshall's second season competing at the NCAA Division I-A level. The team won their second consecutive Mid-American Conference (MAC) championship and was invited to the Motor City Bowl.

Season
In the 1998 season Marshall was quarterbacked by future National Football League (NFL) starter Chad Pennington and featured future NFL player Doug Chapman as the starting running back. The team finished the season with an overall record of 12–1 repeated as champions of the MAC East Division with a 7–1 conference mark.

Marshall met and defeated Toledo in the MAC Championship Game for the second year in a row. By virtue of the win they were invited to the Motor City Bowl where they played the Louisville Cardinals. Marshall won the game 48–29, marking the first bowl game victory in the history of Marshall football.

Schedule

Awards and honors

Bob Pruett, MAC Coach of the Year 
Chad Pennington, First Team All-MAC
Doug Chapman, First Team All-MAC
LaVorn Colclough, First Team All-MAC
Mike Guilliams, First Team All-MAC
Daninelle Derricott, First Team All-MAC
Rogers Beckett, First Team All-MAC
Ricky Hall, First Team All-MAC
Giradie Mercer, First Team All-MAC

References

Marshall
Marshall Thundering Herd football seasons
Mid-American Conference football champion seasons
Little Caesars Pizza Bowl champion seasons
Marshall Thundering Herd football